Flexicurity (a portmanteau of "flexibility" and "security") is a welfare state model with a pro-active labour market policy. The term was first coined by the social democratic Prime Minister of Denmark Poul Nyrup Rasmussen in the 1990s.

The term refers to the combination of labour market flexibility in a dynamic economy and security for workers.

The Government of Denmark views flexicurity as entailing a "golden triangle" with a "three-sided mix of (1) flexibility in the labour market combined with (2) social security and (3) an active labour market policy with rights and obligations for the unemployed".

The European Commission considers flexicurity as an integrated strategy to simultaneously enhance flexibility and security in the labour market. Flexicurity is designed and implemented across four policy components: 1) flexible and reliable contractual arrangements; 2) comprehensive lifelong learning strategies; 3) effective active labour market policies; and 4) modern social security systems providing adequate income support during employment transitions.

It is important to recognize that the flexicurity concept has been developed in countries with high wages, besides clear progressive taxation, as in for example, Denmark.

History

In Denmark 

The Danish flexicurity model has its roots in the nineteenth century, when negotiations among employers and trade unions during the so-called September Compromise of 1899 (also called Labour Market Constitution) laid the ground for a mutually beneficial (profitable and secure) state. The 'Constitution' was revised in 1960 and renamed Basic Agreement. It settled the freedom of trade union association as well as the managerial prerogative to manage and divide the work including the right to hire and dismiss the labour force at any time necessary. "It is thus important to understand that the Danish model of labour market regulation, including the right to form associations, is based on these voluntaristic principles and that legislation or interference of the state is kept on a minimum. The right of association and the recognition of labour market associations are based on the mutual recognition of conflicting interests." The Danish tripartite agreements amongst employers, workers, and the state are supported by an intricate system that allows for an active response from the state, which supports the 'activation' of workers.

In the early 1990s, Danish policymakers established a fiscal policy aimed at breaking the unemployment trend of the time and was further coupled to the first active labour market policy (ALMP) of 1994 which sought to reduce structural unemployment. Although some believed that the natural unemployment rate had simply increased, the Danish government sought to improve the situation by implementing what came to be called the flexicurity model. The policy shift thus came about with the 1994 and 1996 labour market reforms, when the introduction of flexibility was linked to security through the continued provision of generous welfare schemes as well as the 'activation' of the labour force through a set of ALMPs. Activation in Denmark is regarded as "a right and an obligation". The effects expected from this combination were twofold: qualification effects of the labour market policies (LMPs) as well as motivational effects through the welfare schemes.

The unemployment benefits and training provision that this system entail place a higher burden of taxation upon the higher-earning members of the Danish society. Denmark currently has high taxation rates which in part pay for generous social benefits. Flexicurity may thus favour low- to middle-income earners. However, this might partially be offset by Denmark's high-output growth which is coupled to low unemployment figures (2.8% in 2008) and similarly low social-exclusion rates. In recent years, Danes have been consistently ranked as the happiest nation on Earth, which has in part been attributed to aspects of Denmark's flexicurity model.

In the European employment strategy 

In the European Commission's approach, flexicurity is about striking the right balance between flexible job arrangements and secure transitions between jobs, so that more and better jobs can be created. The idea is that flexibility and security should not be seen as opposites but as complementary. Flexibility is about developing flexible work organisations where people can combine their work and private responsibilities; where they can keep their training up-to-date; and where they can potentially have flexible working hours. It is also about giving both employers and employees a more flexible environment for changing jobs. Security means 'employment security' – to provide people with the training they need to keep their skills up-to-date and to develop their talent as well as providing them with adequate unemployment benefits if they were to lose their job for a period of time.

Flexicurity is also seen as a way to preserve the European social model while maintaining and improving the competitiveness of the European Union. It is argued that, in the context of globalisation and technological change which place greater demands on business to adapt continuously, high levels of employment security will not depend only on protection of workers' specific job, but mainly on the means for workers to stay on the job market, manage smooth transitions between jobs, and make progress in their careers.

Furthermore, flexicurity is seen as a strategy to make labour markets significantly more inclusive in some of the European countries, by tackling labour market segmentation between insiders (workers well-established in stable, quality jobs) and outsiders (unemployed persons or in precarious employment who do not benefit from other advantages linked to a permanent contract, frequently youth, migrants, etc.). The relevance of flexicurity to tackle modern labour market challenges has also been recognised by the representatives of social partners at a transnational European level, by European Trade Union Confederation and BusinessEurope.

Flexicurity has therefore been adopted as a leitmotiv of the European employment strategy and the revised Lisbon Strategy for Growth and Jobs. In particular, the Guideline No.21 of the Integrated Guidelines for Growth and Employment (adopted by the European Council and setting the objectives for the periods 2005-2008 and 2008–2010) calls on Member States to "…promote flexibility combined with employment security and reduce labour market segmentation, having due regard to the role of the social partners".

A key Communication from the European Commission "Towards Common Principles of Flexicurity: More and better jobs through flexibility and security" was published in June 2007 defines flexicurity as an 'integrated approach' based on four interacting components.

Recognising the principle of a "no size fits for all" the European Commissions advocated for a progressive implementation of national, tailor-made, flexicurity strategies in all EU Member States supported by mutual learning, along the lines of commonly agreed principles. Such common principles were adopted on 5 December 2007 by the Employment and Social Affairs Council.

At the council's request, the European Commission has launched the "Mission for flexicurity", consisting of representatives of the French Presidency and the preceding Slovenian Presidency of the European Union and of the European social partners. The Mission took place between April and July 2008 in France, Sweden, Finland, Poland, and Spain, seeking to promote the implementation of flexicurity in different national contexts by raising the profile of the flexicurity approach and its common principles and by helping the relevant labour market actors to take ownership of the process. The Mission also had the objective of promoting the exchange of good practice and mutual learning between Member States. It reported to the Council in December 2008.

Flexicurity featured prominently in the commission's response to the crisis, in the European Economic Recovery Plan of November 2008 and its follow up Communication "Driving economic recovery" of March 2009.

Most recently, the European Council of June 2009 concluded that "in the current situation [of crisis], 'flexicurity' is an important means by which to modernise and foster the adaptability of labour markets."

Current state 

Upon the adoption of the common principles of flexicurity, the Council called on the Member States to take them into account in drawing up and implementing "national flexicurity pathways". Progress in the implementation of flexicurity strategies is reported by Member States in their National Reform Programmes and is monitored by the European Commission in the framework of the European Employment Strategy.

The 2011 Euro Plus Pact calls for its promotion in the Eurozone.

Criticism 

Flexicurity has been criticized as "a purely linguistic combination of opposites that can be applied to virtually any policy mix."
Basing on methodological and empirical analysis, a dedicated monograph
criticizes flexicurity from ten viewpoints (European welfare state, working conditions, precariousness of work, trade unionist, with regard to the 2007-8 financial crisis, etc.), proposes several alternative measures like flexinsurance, workplace tax, etc.,
and concludes:

See also 
 Decent work
 European labour law
 Job security
 Labour market flexibility
 Nordic model
 Precarious work

Further reading 

 Kreiner, Claus Thustrup, and Michael Svarer. 2022. "Danish Flexicurity: Rights and Duties." Journal of Economic Perspectives 36 (4): 81-102.

Notes

References 
 Acemoglu, Daron and Robert Shimer (2000). "Productivity Gains From Unemployment Insurance". European Economic Review 44, 1195–1224.
 Björklund, A. (2000) "Going Different Ways: Labour Market Policies in Denmark and Sweden" in G. Esping-Andersen and M. Regini (Eds.) Why Deregulate Labour Markets? Oxford University Press: Oxford.
 Bredgaard, T., F. Larsen and P. K. Madsen (2005) "The Flexible Danish Labour Market – A Review" Centre for Labour Market Research (CARMA) Research Paper 31:2005, CARMA: Aalborg, Denmark.
 Bredgaard, T., F. Larsen and P. K. Madsen (2006) "The challenges of identifying flexicurity in action" Centre for Labour Market Research (CARMA), paper presented during the conference "Flexicurity and Beyond", 12–13 October 2006, Aalborg, Denmark.
 Crouch, C. (1999) Social Change in Western Europe, Oxford University Press: Oxford.
 EC (European Commission) (2005) Working Together for Growth and Jobs. Integrated Guidelines for Growth and Jobs (2005–2008), Office for Official Publication of the European Communities: Luxembourg.
 EC (European Commission) (2006) "Vladimír Špidla, Member of the European Commission responsible for Employment, Social Affairs and Equal Opportunities, Informal Ministerial Meeting: "Flexicurity", Informal Ministerial Meeting: "Flexicurity", Villach (Austria), 20 January 2006" Press release, http://europa.eu/rapid/pressReleasesAction.do?reference=SPEECH/06/20&format=HTML&aged=0&language=EN&guiLanguage=en.
 EC (European Commission) (2006) Employment in Europe 2006, Office for Official Publication of the European Communities: Luxembourg.
 EC (European Commission) (2007) "New EU report shows active labour policy can increase employment rate despite low growth", http://ec.europa.eu/employment_social/emplweb/news/news_en.cfm?id=81.
 Esping-Andersen, G. (1999) Social Foundations of Postindustrial Economies, Oxford University Press: Oxford.
 Esping-Andersen, G. and M. Regini (Eds.) (2000) Why Deregulate Labour Markets? Oxford University Press: Oxford.
 European Foundation for the Improvement of Living and Working Conditions (2007) "Flexicurity", http://www.eurofound.eu.int/areas/industrialrelations/dictionary/definitions/FLEXICURITY.htm.
 Jørgensen, H. (2000) "Danish labour market policy since 1994 – the new 'Columbus' egg' of labour market regulation?" in P. Klemmer and R. Wink (Eds.) Preventing Unemployment in Europe, Ruhr Research Institute for Regional and Innovation Policy, Edward Elgar: Cheltenham.
 Madsen, P.K. (2006) "How can it possibly fly? The paradox of a dynamic labour market in a Scandinavian welfare state" in J.L. Campbell, J.A. Hall, O.K. Pedersen (Eds.) National Identity and a variety of Capitalism: The Case of Denmark, McGill University Press: Montreal.
 Anderson, J. (2009) "2009 Tax Misery & Reform Index" Forbes Magazine, https://archive.today/20130123114114/http://www.forbes.com/global/2009/0413/034-tax-misery-reform-index.html.
 Sherman, L. (2009) "World's Happiest Places" Forbes Magazine, https://www.forbes.com/2009/05/05/world-happiest-places-lifestyle-travel-world-happiest.html
 Nickell, S. and R. Layard (1999) "Labour market institutions and economic performance" in O. Ashenfelter and D. Card (Eds.) Handbook of Labour Economics, Elsevier: Amsterdam.
 Schulze-Cleven T., B. Watson, and J. Zysman (2007) "How Wealthy Nations Can Stay Wealthy: Innovation and Adaptability in a Digital Era" New Political Economy, 12:4, 451–475.
 Tangian, A. (2011) Flexicurity and Political Philosophy. Nova: New York.
 Sonja Bekker, Ton Wilthagen, Per Kongshoj Madsen, Jianping Zhou, Ralf Rogowski, Maarten Keune, Andranik Tangian (2008), Forum: Flexicurity - a European Approach to Labour Market Policy, in: Intereconomics, 43. Jg., Nr. 2, S. 68–111. (PDF; 388 kB)
 Wilthagen, T. and F. Tros (2004) "The Concept of 'Flexicurity': a new approach to regulating employment and labour markets" in 'Flexicurity: Conceptual Issues and Political Implementation in Europe' Tanfer, European Review of labour and research, vol. 10, No.2.

External links 
 ReflecT: Research Institute for Flexicurity, Labour Market Dynamics and Social Cohesion at Tilburg University.
 Centre for Labour Market Research at Aalborg University (CARMA)
 European Foundation Flexicurity Blog
 Newsarticle EurActiv 06-04-2007
 Newsarticle EurActiv 09-21-2005
 Newsarticle Politiek-digitaal 09-21-2005 (Dutch)
 Indymedia 2004
  FLEXICURITY: Economic Miracle or Social Draw Back? - A Critical Analysis Of The Danish Social Model  A study based on facts and figures

Related conferences 
 Innovating Labour Market Policies Conference site
 5th International Research Conference on Social Security

Welfare in Denmark
Economy of Denmark
Welfare in Europe
Labor in Denmark
1990s neologisms